The 2013 Quaker State 400 presented by Advance Auto Parts was a NASCAR Sprint Cup Series stock car race scheduled to be held on June 29, 2013, at Kentucky Speedway in Sparta, Kentucky, United States, but was postponed to June 30 because of persistent rain. Contested over 267 laps on the 1.5-mile (2.4 km) tri-oval, it was the seventeenth race of the 2013 Sprint Cup Series championship. Matt Kenseth of Joe Gibbs Racing won the race, his fourth win of the 2013 season, while Jamie McMurray finished second. Clint Bowyer, Joey Logano, and Kyle Busch rounded out the top five.

Report

Practice and qualifying

Two practice sessions were held on June 28 in preparation for the race. The first session was 60 minutes, while second session was 90 minutes long.

During the first practice session, Kevin Harvick, for the Richard Childress Racing team, was quickest ahead of Jimmie Johnson in second and Brad Keselowski in third. Kurt Busch was scored fourth, and Jeff Gordon managed fifth. Kyle Busch, Brian Vickers, Juan Pablo Montoya, Paul Menard, and Ricky Stenhouse Jr. rounded out the top ten quickest drivers in the session. In the final practice session for the race, Johnson was quickest with a time of 29.819 seconds. Carl Edwards followed in second, ahead of Kyle Busch and Gordon in third and fourth. Jeff Burton, who was twelfth quickest in second practice, managed fifth.

After his qualifying run, Earnhardt Jr. said, "We thought we had a top-five car in practice, and we got some good cloud cover about six or seven cars in front of us before we went to qualify, and that brought the track temp down to give us a good advantage," Earnhardt said. "It gave us a good opportunity to run a bit quicker lap than maybe what the car had in it." He was joined on the front row of the grid by Edwards. Johnson qualified third, Kyle Busch took fourth, and Marcos Ambrose started fifth. Denny Hamlin, Ryan Newman, Keselowski, Vickers, and Montoya completed the first ten positions on the grid.

Race

Start

First half
The race was scheduled to start Saturday at 8:00 p.m., but pushed to Sunday afternoon due to rain, at 12:00 p.m. E.T., This prompted NASCAR to have a competition caution on Lap 30. Carl Edwards led lap 1. A couple laps later, The fourth caution came out on lap 89 for debris on the track.

Second half
David Gilliland blew a tire and brought out the fifth caution, Kasey Kahne won the free pass, The race restarted on lap 94. The fifth caution of the race came out on lap 149, Jeff Gordon won the free pass under caution. The race restarted on lap 154, Jimmie Johnson took the lead, The fifth caution then came out on lap 241 for a tire blowout.

Wreck again and finish
The race restarted on lap 243 and the sixth caution came out for a wreck again, on lap 246, the race restarted on lap 250, Matt Kenseth won his first race at Kentucky.

Results

Qualifying

Race results

Notes
1.  Points include 3 Chase for the Sprint Cup points for winning, 1 point for leading a lap, and 1 point for most laps led.
2.  Ineligible for driver's championship points.
3.  Post entry, driver and owner did not score points.

Standings after the race

Drivers' Championship standings

Manufacturers' Championship standings

Note: Only the first ten positions are included for the driver standings.

References

Quaker State 400
Quaker State 400
Quaker State 400
NASCAR races at Kentucky Speedway